Bence Somodi (born 25 November 1988) is a Hungarian professional footballer who plays for MTK Budapest FC.

Club statistics

Updated to games played as of 15 May 2021.

References

HLSZ 

1988 births
Living people
Sportspeople from Eger
Hungarian footballers
Association football goalkeepers
Ferencvárosi TC footballers
Vecsés FC footballers
Diósgyőri VTK players
Kazincbarcikai SC footballers
Gyirmót FC Győr players
Fehérvár FC players
Puskás Akadémia FC players
Kaposvári Rákóczi FC players
MTK Budapest FC players
Nemzeti Bajnokság I players
Nemzeti Bajnokság II players
Hungarian expatriate footballers
Expatriate footballers in England
Hungarian expatriate sportspeople in England